Mizukubo Dam is a rockfill dam located in Yamagata Prefecture in Japan. The dam is used for agriculture and water supply. The catchment area of the dam is 68 km2. The dam impounds about 170  ha of land when full and can store 31000 thousand cubic meters of water. The dam was completed in 1975.

References

Dams in Yamagata Prefecture
1975 establishments in Japan